The 2012 Southern Conference football season, part of the 2012 NCAA Division I FCS football season competition of college football, began on Thursday, August 30, 2012 with Western Carolina hosting Mars Hill. The regular season concluded on November 17, while  Georgia Southern, Appalachian State, and Wofford qualified for the NCAA Division I Football Championship.

Appalachian State was eliminated in the first round at the hands of Illinois State. Wofford was subsequently eliminated the following week, losing to North Dakota State 14–7, and Georgia Southern, after defeating Central Arkansas and Old Dominion in the previous two weeks, fell to the Bison as well on December 14 in the tournament semifinals, 23–20.

Preseason Poll Results
First place votes in parentheses

Preseason All-Conference Teams
Offensive Player of the Year: Eric Breitenstein, Sr., RB
Defensive Player of the Year: Brent Russell, Sr., DL

Rankings

Regular season 

All times Eastern time.

Rankings reflect that of the Sports Network poll for that week.

Week One 

Players of the week:

Week Two 

Players of the week:

Week Three 

Players of the week:

Week Four 

Players of the week:

Week Five 

Players of the week:

Week Six 

Players of the week:

Week Seven 

Players of the week:

Week Eight 

Players of the week:

Week Nine 

Players of the week:

Week Ten 

Players of the week:

Week Eleven 

Players of the week:

Week Twelve 

Players of the week:

Attendance

References